KOCC-LP (101.5 FM, "Worship 101") is a low-power FM radio station licensed to Oxnard, California and serving the Ventura County area. The station is owned by Calvary Chapel of Oxnard and broadcasts a Christian radio format featuring sermons and worship music.

KOCC-LP began operating in 2014.

References

External links

OCC-LP
Low-power FM radio stations in California